Kung Fu Panda: Showdown of Legendary Legends is a fighting video game based on the Kung Fu Panda franchise. It was released on various platforms including PlayStation 4, PlayStation 3, Xbox 360, Xbox One, Nintendo 3DS, Wii U and Microsoft Windows. The  PlayStation 4, PlayStation 3, Xbox 360, Xbox One, Nintendo 3DS, and Windows released in Europe on November 27, 2015, and in North America on December 1, 2015. The Wii U version was later released on December 15, 2015.

Conrad Vernon, Steele Gagnon, Sumalee Montano, James Hong and Randall Duk Kim reprise their roles from the film series. Mick Wingert, Amir Talai, Max Koch and James Sie reprise their roles from the video game franchise and TV series. Fred Tatasciore reprises his roles from film series, video game franchise and TV series.

It was the last licensed game to be released by Little Orbit as the company announced in May 2018 that it was moving away from licensed games in order to focus on creating original works.

The game was removed from digital storefronts on January 1, 2019 due to the expiration of Little Orbit's Kung Fu Panda license.

Gameplay
Kung Fu Panda: Showdown of Legendary Legends is a platform fighter and features characters from all the three movies including the main protagonist Po, "Furious Five" and all the villains.

Reception
Kung Fu Panda: Showdown of Legendary Legends received mixed to average reviews from critics with Metacritic giving the Xbox One version 68 out of 100 based on 4 critics.

References

2015 video games
Fighting games
Kung Fu Panda video games
Platform fighters
PlayStation 3 games
PlayStation 4 games
Nintendo 3DS games
Nintendo 3DS eShop games
Video games developed in the United States
Wii U games
Wii U eShop games
Windows games
Xbox 360 games
Xbox One games
Video games about bears
Video games set in China